The International Palladium Medal is an award given annually by the Société de Chimie Industrielle (American Section) in New York to someone who has made outstanding contributions to the chemical industry on an international level. When founded in 1918, the Société de Chimie Industrielle in New York was an American section of an international organization based in Paris. It is currently an independent society.

The International Palladium Medal was instituted in 1958 and first awarded in 1961. The first recipient was Ernest-John Solvay, for his "untiring efforts to promote freer exchange of both technical information and products of chemistry."  The medal has generally been given every two years. It has been awarded to recipients from America, Belgium, France, Germany and Great Britain.

Recipients

External links
 Société de Chimie Industrielle
 Société de Chimie Industrielle. French Wikipedia.

See also

 List of chemistry awards

References

Awards established in 1961
Chemistry awards